Dadh Budruk is a village in Rahata taluka of the Ahmednagar district in Maharashtra, India. The village is known for its temples, particularly Sant Mukund Das Maharaj Samadhi Temple on the Pravara river, and Shiv Temple. The village is 28 km from Shirdi, a town known as the home of Shri Sai Baba.

Population
As per 2011 census, population of village is 7622, of which 3988 are males and 3634 are females.

Economy
Main occupation of village resident is agriculture and allied works. The primary crops of the village are sugar cane, wheat and cotton.

Transport

Road
Dadh budruk is connected to nearby villages Durgapur, Hasnapur, Dhanore and Chinchpur by village roads.

Rail
Shrirampur (Belapur) is the nearest railway station to a village.

Air
Shirdi Airport is the nearest airport to a village.

See also
List of villages in Rahata taluka

References 

Villages in Ahmednagar district